Burnt by the Sun 3: The Citadel is a 2011 Russian language film directed by Nikita Mikhalkov, released on May 5, 2011. It is a sequel to the films Burnt by the Sun (1994) and Burnt by the Sun 2 (2010).

Plot
The film takes place in 1943 during the height of the Great Patriotic War.

Mitya (Oleg Menshikov) finds Kotov (Nikita Mikhalkov) in the ranks of the penalty battalion, standing at the walls of an impregnable Citadel. Drunken general Melezhko orders the penal servicemen to attack the fortress, though this means certain death. Noticing Mitya and not wanting to meet him, Kotov, without waiting for the team, raises the penalty boxers to attack. Mitya is forced to undergo heavy fire from the enemy, since the trenches are not allowed to return to the ZAG, firing on the back stairs. Mitya and Kotov remain unscathed. After the battle, taking Kotov to the rear, Mitya tells him everything that he did and gives him a gun. However, Kotov does not kill Mitya. Mitya reports that Kotov was rehabilitated and awarded the rank of Lieutenant-General.

Nadia, by that time shell-shocked, serves in the medical unit. The truck with the wounded and pregnant woman in which she rides falls under the bombardment of German aviation. Despite the bomb, which fell two meters from the truck, she remains unscathed. The wounded give birth and call the child (whose father is a German) by Joseph Vissarionovich, in honor of Stalin.

Mitya and Kotov come to the dacha where the commander once lived with his family (the house that appears in Burnt by the Sun). However, no one expected Kotov, since it was believed that he was shot. Marusya (Viktoria Tolstoganova) is raising a child from Kirik (Vladimir Ilyin). The arrival of Kotov violates the peace of the household, and the next day, the whole family decides to leave secretly. The general overtakes them at the station, but lets them go, as he begs Marusya to stay.

Later, Stalin orders Kotov to carry out a complicated and almost doomed operation: to lead 15,000 civil men, who for various reasons avoided participation in hostilities, into a frontal attack on the Citadel so that the defenders would spend ammunition on it, a storm to the Citadel with low losses among soldiers. If successful, Stalin promises to give Kotov the army command.

Meanwhile, Mitya is arrested and accused of espionage and preparing an assassination attempt on Stalin. He is relieved to sign the protocols for a death sentence, as he has long awaited death. Those who arrived in civil trenches are given shanks from shovels.

Kotov must give the order for the offensive, descends into the trenches and slowly goes to the Citadel. The fall of the corpse of a German soldier accidentally causes a fire in the citadel, causing it to explode. In the last scene, Kotov is a Hero of the Soviet Union and rides with Nadia on a tank at the head of a tank column of Soviet troops heading for Berlin.

References

External links
 The Guardian: Russian critics brand Burnt By the Sun 3: Citadel 'inappropriate' for Oscar nomination race
 

2010s historical drama films
Mosfilm films
Films directed by Nikita Mikhalkov
Films about the Soviet Union in the Stalin era
Films scored by Eduard Artemyev
Films shot in the Czech Republic
Russian historical drama films
Russian war drama films
2010s Russian-language films
Russian sequel films
Eastern Front of World War II films
2011 war drama films
2011 films
2011 drama films
Films produced by Nikita Mikhalkov
Films with screenplays by Nikita Mikhalkov